Reggie Lowe (born June 14, 1975) is a former American football defensive end. He played for the Jacksonville Jaguars in 1998, the Los Angeles Xtreme in 2001 and for the Montreal Alouettes in 2002.

References

1975 births
Living people
American football defensive ends
Troy Trojans football players
Jacksonville Jaguars players
Rhein Fire players
Los Angeles Xtreme players
Montreal Alouettes players
Players of American football from Washington, D.C.